Lynda Block may refer to:

Lynda Block (Dream Team), fictional character in the TV series Dream Team
Lynda Lyon Block (1948–2002), American murderer